Sir John Cutts (or Cutt) (1545–1615), of Horham Hall, Essex; Shenley Hall, Hertfordshire and Childerley, Cambridgeshire, was an English politician.

Sir John's great-grandfather, also Sir John (died 1521), held the position of under-treasurer in the household of King Henry VII. His son John Cutts married Luce Browne, daughter of Sir Anthony Browne (died 1506) and granddaughter of John Neville, 1st Marquess of Montagu (died 1471) and Isabel Ingaldesthorpe. After John's death in 1528, leaving a son little more than an infant, Luce remarried to Sir Thomas Clyfford. The child married Sybil, daughter of Sir John Hynde of Madingley (who died in 1550), and being of age in 1547 became Sir John Cutts of Childerley and Horham Hall. This gentleman became implicated in a suspected conspiracy planned in Suffolk with his brother-in-law Sir Francis Hynde and, having gone into exile in Italy, died of pleurisy in Venice in May 1555. His widow Sybil (Hynde), mother of the present Sir John Cutts, M.P., remarried to the politician John Hutton.

John was educated at Trinity College, Cambridge and trained in the law at Gray's Inn. He was knighted by the Earl of Leicester in 1571. He was appointed a Justice of the Peace (JP) for Cambridgeshire in 1579, Hertfordshire in 1582 and Essex in 1586. He was a Member (MP) of the Parliament of England for Cambridgeshire 1584, 1586 and 1601. He served as Sheriff of Cambridgeshire and Huntingdonshire for 1572–73 and 1601-2 and as High Sheriff of Hertfordshire for 1588–89.

He married twice: first to Anne, the daughter of Sir Arthur Darcy of Huntingdonshire, with whom he had a son and two daughters, and secondly to Margaret, the daughter and coheiress of John Brocket of Brocket Hall, Hertfordshire, with whom he had another son. He was succeeded by his son John.

References

1545 births
1615 deaths
Alumni of Trinity College, Cambridge
Members of Gray's Inn
English knights
People from South Cambridgeshire District
People from Uttlesford (district)
People from Shenley
English MPs 1584–1585
High Sheriffs of Cambridgeshire and Huntingdonshire
High Sheriffs of Hertfordshire
English MPs 1586–1587
English MPs 1601